The Constitution of Australia (or Australian Constitution) is a constitutional document that is supreme law in Australia.  It establishes Australia as a federation under a constitutional monarchy and outlines the structure and powers of the Australian government's three constituent parts, the executive, legislature, and judiciary.

The constitution was drafted between 1891 and 1898 through a series of conventions conducted by representatives of the six self-governing British colonies in Australia. The final draft was then approved in a set of referendums from 1898 to 1900. The British government objected to some elements of the final draft, but a slightly modified form was enacted as section 9 of the Commonwealth of Australia Constitution Act 1900, an act of the Parliament of the United Kingdom. The act was given royal assent on 9 July 1900, was proclaimed on 17 September 1900, and entered into force on 1 January 1901. The constitution gave the six colonies the status of states within the new federation.

Australian constitutional law has developed through the interpretation of the constitution by the High Court. As well as its textual provisions, the constitution is understood to incorporate various unwritten constitutional conventions and ideas derived from the Westminster system, one of which is responsible government. Although the 1900 act initially derived its legal authority from the UK Parliament, the present understanding of the High Court and some academics is that it now derives its legal authority from the Australian people. Other documents of constitutional significance to Australia include the Statute of Westminster and the Australia Act 1986.

The document may only be amended by referendum, through the procedure set out in section 128. Amendments require a "double majority" – a nationwide majority as well as a majority of voters in a majority of states. This has contributed to the low number of successful amendments; forty-four referendums have been held but only eight amendments have been passed, most recently in 1977. Ongoing debates exist regarding further proposals for amendment, notably including the inclusion of a preamble, the replacement of the monarchy with a republic, and the addition of an Indigenous voice to government.

History

Prior to federation 

Political movements to federate the Australian colonies grew to prominence in the mid 19th century. Multiple motivations existed for increased political co-operation between the colonies; including a desire to regulate inter-colonial tariffs. Tensions existed however between the larger colonies and the smaller ones, and in the degree to which each colony embraced protectionist policies. Those tensions and the outbreak of the American Civil War harmed the political case for federalism in the 1850s and 60s.

In 1889 the Federal Council of Australasia was established. It arose out of a fear of the growing presence of German and French colonies in the Pacific, and a growing Australian identity. The council could legislate on certain subjects but did not have a permanent secretariat, an executive, or independent source of revenue. Perhaps most problematically New South Wales, the largest colony, did not join the body.

A series of conferences to discuss federalism was promoted by the Premier of New South Wales Henry Parkes; the first held in 1890 at Melbourne, and another at Sydney in 1891. These conferences were attended by most colonial leaders. By the 1891 conference the federalist cause gained momentum. Discussion turned to what the proper system of federal government ought to be. A draft constitution was drawn up at the conference under the guidance of Sir Samuel Griffith, however, these meetings lacked popular support. An additional problem was that this draft constitution sidestepped some critical issues like tariff policy. The 1891 draft was submitted to colonial parliaments, however it lapsed in New South Wales. After that event other colonies were unwilling to proceed.

In 1895, the six premiers of the Australian colonies agreed to establish a new Convention by popular vote. The Convention met over the course of a year from 1897 to 1898. The meetings produced a new draft which contained substantially the same principles of government as the 1891 draft, but with added provisions for responsible government. Some delegates to the 1898 Constitutional Convention favoured a section similar to the Bill of Rights of the United States Constitution, but this was decided against.

To ensure popular support, the 1898 draft was presented to the electors of each colony. After one failed attempt, an amended draft was submitted to the electors of each colony except Western Australia. After ratification by the five colonies, the Bill was presented to the British Imperial Parliament with an Address requesting Queen Victoria to enact the Bill.

Prior to the bill's enactment, a final change was made after lobbying by the colonial Chief Justices. This change established a right to appeal from the High Court to the UK Judicial Committee of the Privy Council. After the change, the 'Commonwealth of Australia Constitution Act' was passed by the British Parliament in 1900. Western Australia then agreed to join the Commonwealth in order to ensure it would be an 'original state'. The Commonwealth of Australia was then officially established on 1 January 1901.

After federation 
At federation, six British colonies became a single federated nation. Some British Imperial laws remained in force, together with those of the Australian legislatures;   although, according to Robert Menzies, "the real and administrative legislative independence of Australia (was) never challenged" after the creation of the Commonwealth. The formal power of the British Imperial parliament to legislate with effect in Australia was restricted by the UK's passage in 1931 of the Statute of Westminster, adopted into Australian law by the Statute of Westminster Adoption Act 1942. The adoption act acceded Australia to the Statute of Westminster retroactively, with the date set to 3 September 1939, when Australia along with the rest of the British Empire entered World War II.

Australia arguably did not achieve full, de jure independence from the UK until 1986, with the passage of the Australia Act. That act formally ended the UK parliament's ability to legislate over Australian states, and also abolished all appeals from Australian courts to the UK Judicial Committee of the Privy Council.

In 1988, the original copy of the Commonwealth of Australia Constitution Act 1900 from the Public Record Office in London was lent to Australia for the purposes of the Australian Bicentenary. The Australian government requested permission to keep the copy, and the British Parliament agreed by passing the Australian Constitution (Public Record Copy) Act 1990. The copy was given to the National Archives of Australia. A curiosity of the document's history is that the act remains in force as a statute of the UK in its original form, while in Australia it has force with the constitutional amendments made by referendum (its preamble and the covering clauses have never been amended). Australian High Court judges have discussed in obiter that the constitution's source of lawful authority may no longer reside in the imperial parliament, but may instead now derive its lawful authority from the Australian people.

Following the 2017–18 Australian parliamentary eligibility crisis, there was discussion of whether to retain or replace the current constitution. Former Prime Minister Bob Hawke advocated for getting "rid of the constitution we've got", and replacing the constitution with a system that does not include states.

Commemoration
Constitution Day is celebrated on 9 July, the date the constitution became law in 1900. The date is not a public holiday. Constitution Day was first held on 9 July 2000 to mark the centenary of the constitution in the lead up to the Centenary of Federation. Further events have not been widely held since 2001. The day was revived in 2007 and is jointly organised by the National Archives and the Department of Immigration and Citizenship.

Document structure and text

Covering clauses 
The Commonwealth of Australia Constitution Act 1900 (Imp) consists of nine sections.  Section 9 contains the constitution.  Since the constitution itself is divided into "sections", sections 1 to 8 of the Act have come to be known for convenience as the "covering clauses".  The second covering clause is interpretive, specifying that throughout the Act references to "the Queen" are (in effect) references to whoever is the monarch in the UK.  In this period, "the Crown" was considered to be the same entity everywhere in the British Empire.  Although that is no longer assumed, the rules of succession remain almost unchanged.

Main document 
The constitution is divided into eight chapters, collectively containing 128 sections. The first three chapters state the respective powers of the legislature, executive, and judiciary. This split into three chapters has been interpreted by the High Court as giving rise to a substantive separation of powers doctrine in Australia.

Chapter I: The Parliament sets up the legislative branch of government. Its constituent parts are stated to be the Sovereign (represented by the Governor-General), the Senate, and the House of Representatives. It provides for the number of representatives to attend each body, and provides that the representatives attending both must be chosen directly by the electorate. Each electorate of the house of representatives is to be apportioned equally by population, whereas senators are allocated unevenly between "original states", the territories, and future states (of which none presently exist). The house of representatives is required to have twice as many members as the senate. Chapter I also defines the role of the monarch in relation to the legislature, although the monarch's own powers over legislation are now regarded as defunct.

The chapter notably also provides for the powers of the Commonwealth parliament. The parliament is not granted plenary power by the constitution. Section 51 contains a list of enumerated topics that the Commonwealth parliament is permitted to legislate upon. States may also legislate upon these topics, but Commonwealth law prevails in the event of inconsistency between the laws. Section 52 contains a brief list of topics that only the Commonwealth may legislate upon. Some relevant powers of the Governor-General are provided here: to summon, prorogue or dissolve the federal parliament, and to give or refuse royal assent to federal bills.

Other matters dealt within the chapter include eligibility issues for voting or standing in elections; and miscellaneous matters regarding parliamentary procedures and allowances.

Chapter II: The Executive Government sets up the executive branch. Executive power is stated to be exercised by the Governor-General, who appoints a Federal Executive Council and is to act "with" its advice. The Governor-General is empowered to appoint and dismiss ministers, and is the ceremonial commander-in-chief of the Australian armed forces. This colonial model differs substantially from the reality, which since Federation has followed constitutional convention drawn from the United Kingdom. By convention, almost all executive authority is exercised by a prime minister and a cabinet..

Chapter III: The Judicature sets up the judicial branch. Commonwealth judicial power is vested in a federal supreme court to be called the High Court of Australia. The parliament is authorised to create federal courts, and to vest the exercise of federal judicial power within the courts of the states. Section 74 (now defunct) provides for the circumstances in which an appeal may be made to the Queen in Council, section 75 provides for the High Court's jurisdiction, and section 80 guarantees trial by jury for indictable offences against the Commonwealth.

Chapter IV: Finance and Trade deals with commercial matters within the federation. Section 81 prescribes all Commonwealth revenue to a Consolidated Revenue Fund, and s90 gives the Commonwealth exclusive power over custom and excise duties. Section 92 is notable for prescribing 'absolutely free' trade and commerce between the states. Section 96 allows the Commonwealth to make grants on terms determined by Parliament. Section 101 sets up an Inter-State Commission, now defunct.

Chapter V: The States contains provisions dealing with the states and their role in the federal system. Sections 106-108 preserve the powers of the states, section 109 provides that Commonwealth legislation prevails over that of a state to the extent of any inconsistency. Section 111 provides for surrender of state territory to the Commonwealth, section 114 forbids states to raise military forces without Commonwealth permission, and also forbids the Commonwealth to tax property of a state government and the reverse. Section 116 forbids the Commonwealth to establish a national religion, to impose any religious observance or prohibit the free exercise of any religion, or to impose a religious test for office.

Chapter VI: New States allows for the establishment or admission of new states, and allows parliament to provide for representation of the territories. It also provides that state boundaries must require the consent of a state before alteration by referendum.

Chapter VII: Miscellaneous contains provisions on varied topics. In 1911 New South Wales ceded to the Commonwealth what is now the Australian Capital Territory. Canberra, built within it, was declared the national capital in 1913. Section 126 permits the Governor-General to appoint deputies.

Section 127 provided that "aboriginal natives" were not to be included in headcounts for electoral purposes. That section was removed by referendum in 1967.

Chapter VIII: Alteration of the Constitution is a single section providing for amendments. It prescribes that alterations may only occur through a referendum bill being approved at a national referendum. A national referendum under this section requires a 'double majority' to be valid, which consists of a majority return of electors nationally, and a majority return in a majority of states.

Schedule
The constitution also contains a schedule setting out the wording of the oath and affirmation of allegiance. By convention, the Governor-General and members of parliament are required to swear an oath or affirmation of allegiance before taking office.

The oath reads:

By convention the oath or affirmation of office made by a prime minister, ministers and parliamentary secretaries when entering office is not that contained within this schedule. Rather, it is determined by the prime minister of the day, and administered to them by the Governor-General. This convention has been in place since 1901.

Unwritten conventions 
Constitutional conventions are an important part of the Australian constitution. Despite being unwritten, they are understood to be incorporated within the document.

The conventions primarily derive from the unwritten parliamentary conventions within the Westminster system of responsible government.

Some notable conventions include the existence of the Prime Minister of Australia, as head of cabinet in council. Another is that the Governor-General by convention acts on the advice of the Prime Minister.

Advice to the Governor-General is given by the prime minister and, also by convention, the prime minister's advice is ordinarily to be followed. There may, however, be circumstances in which a Governor-General has to act, or may choose to act, without or against prime ministerial advice.  These include a situation where, following a general election, no party has an overall majority in the House of Representatives, so that the Governor-General has to choose a prime minister without a prime minister to give advice.  Such discretions are known as the Governor-General's "reserve powers", but it is uncertain what they include and it remains highly controversial that in 1975 a Governor-General dismissed a prime minister who, in the Governor-General's opinion, was unable to obtain supply.

Unwritten conventions during the dismissal 
The nature of constitutional conventions gave rise to controversy during the dismissal of the Whitlam Government in 1975. In that episode, the Governor-General Sir John Kerr dismissed the Labor Prime Minister Gough Whitlam, and appointed the Liberal opposition leader Malcolm Fraser as caretaker Prime Minister pending the 1975 general election. Multiple conventions were broken during the dismissal including:
 The convention that, in the event of a Senate vacancy, the state government would nominate a replacement from the same political party. This convention was broken by the Lewis government of New South Wales. Notably, this unwritten convention was later formally incorporated into the written constitution via national referendum in 1977.
 The convention that a Prime Minister who cannot obtain supply must first either request that the governor general call a general election, or resign. Gough Whitlam broke this convention by refusing to call an election after the Senate's block of supply.

Interpretation

The High Court is primarily responsible for interpreting the constitution. The legal doctrines historically applied by the court its process have varied. Some such doctrines have included the 'separation of powers', 'intergovernmental immunities', and 'reserved state powers'.

While the document does not include a bill of rights, some rights and/or restrictions are expressly stated. Among these are the section 80 right to trial by jury for indictable offences, the section 51(xxxi) right to just compensation, and the section 117 right against discrimination based on state residence. Section 116, which limits Commonwealth legislative power concerning religion, indirectly provides individuals with rights of religious observance and other exercise of religion, and freedom from religious tests for office.

The High Court has also read a number of important legal implications into the document. One of these is the 'freedom of political communication', the other is a freedom of interference from voting in elections. Both doctrines are born of the section 7 and section 24 requirements that representatives in Australia's houses of parliament be 'directly chosen by the people'. These implications, which limit Commonwealth legislative power, have been characterised as 'freedoms' or 'guarantees' by members of the High Court, and the court has been wary of describing them as 'implied rights' or 'implied constitutional rights'. Some scholars have argued that the High Court's purported distinction between a 'right' versus a 'freedom' is misleading and/or little more than semantic, but it is still used by the court.

While the incumbent monarch is King Charles III, his capacity as king of Australia is separate to his capacities as monarch to other nations.

Alterations to the constitution

Historical referendums and amendments 

Amendment to the constitution requires a referendum in which the amending act is approved by a majority in at least four states, as well as a nationwide majority.

Forty-four proposals to amend the constitution have been voted on at referendums, only eight of which have been approved. The eight proposals that have achieved approval are:
 1906 – Senate Electionsamended section 13 to slightly alter the length and dates of senators' terms of office.
 1910 – State Debtsamended section 105 to extend the power of the Commonwealth to take over pre-existing state debts, to debts incurred by a state at any time.
 1928 – State Debtsinserted section 105A to ensure the constitutional validity of the financial agreement reached between the Commonwealth and state governments in 1927.
 1946 – Social Servicesinserted section 51 (xxiiiA) to extend the power of the Commonwealth over a range of social services.
 1967 – Aboriginal Australiansamended section 51 (xxvi) to extend the powers of the Commonwealth to Indigenous Australians in states; repealed section 127 preventing the inclusion of all Indigenous Australians in population counts for constitutional purposes.
 1977 – Three amendments: First to ensure Senate casual vacancies be filled by a member of the same political party; Second to allow residents of Australian territories to vote in referendums; Third to mandate a retirement age of 70 for judges in federal courts.

Proposals for amendment via British legislation
In the first decades after federation, before Australia's constitutional relationship with the United Kingdom had been clarified, two serious attempts were made to amend the constitution via a British act of parliament, in order to circumvent the referendum provisions of section 128:
 In 1917, during World War I, Prime Minister Billy Hughes sought to amend the constitution to allow for the constitutionally required federal election to be postponed, thereby extending the term of his government. The House of Representatives passed a motion by 34 votes to 17 calling on the British parliament to amend the Constitution Act; Hughes had already secured the support of the British government for his tactic. However, the equivalent motion in the Senate was defeated after Nationalist senators Thomas Bakhap and John Keating crossed the floor. Hughes then called the 1917 federal election, which saw his government re-elected.
 In 1934, the Western Australian state government petitioned the British parliament to amend the Constitution Act to allow it to withdraw from the federation. This followed a 1933 referendum in which the state voted to secede from the rest of Australia, the results of which were rejected by the federal government. The petition, presented by former premier Hal Colebatch, was heard by a joint select committee of the House of Commons and House of Lords, which rejected it on the grounds that it broke the principle of non-interference in Dominion matters recently codified in the Statute of Westminster 1931.

Existing major amendment proposals 
Multiple ongoing debates exist regarding changes to the Australian constitution. These include debates on the inclusion of a preamble, proposals for an Australian republic, and addition of a formal recognition and/or Indigenous 'voice' to the document.

Inclusion of a preamble 

The Australian constitution does not itself contain a preamble, although an enacting formula prefaces the document as passed in the UK Parliament.

Proposals to include a preamble have been controversial, one argument being that the inclusion of a preamble could affect the High Court's interpretations of other provisions within the document.

In 1999, a proposed preamble authored by the then Prime Minister John Howard, with the assistance of poet Les Murray, was defeated in a referendum concurrent to that on a proposal to become a republic.

Republic proposals

Debates on whether Australian should become a republic have existed since Federation.

In November 1999 a referendum was held as to whether the Queen and the Governor-General ought be removed from the constitution, to be replaced with a President. The referendum failed to carry.

Indigenous recognition and voice

Since 1910, there have been calls for constitutional reform to recognise Indigenous Australians. In 1967, the constitution was amended providing the Commonwealth with the power to legislate for all Indigenous Australians by removing the restriction preventing the Commonwealth from legislating in states. At the same time, a limitation on including all Indigenous Australians in population counts for constitutional purposes was removed, which in 1967 was relevant only to section 24. Since those reforms, other proposals have emerged. Guaranteed parliamentary representatives, a constitutionally recognised voice, and an inclusion of Indigenous Australians in a preamble to the constitution; are all proposals that have been made to reform the Australian constitution to recognise Indigenous Australians.

In his Closing the Gap speech in February 2020, Prime Minister Morrison reinforced the work of the Referendum Council, rejecting the idea of merely symbolic recognition, supporting a voice co-designed by Aboriginal and Torres Strait Islander people, "using the language of listening and empowerment". The Labor Party has supported a voice enshrined in the constitution for a long time, and so have many of Australia's left-leaning minor parties.

See also

 Constitution (Recognition of Aboriginal Peoples) Amendment Act 2013 (South Australia)
 Constitutional economics
 Constitutionalism
 Indigenous treaties in Australia
 Process model (Australia)
 Secessionism in Western Australia
 State constitution (Australia)

Notes

References

Citations

Sources 
 Primary sources

 
 
 
 
 
 
 
 
 
 
 
 
 
 

 Secondary sources

Further reading

External links

 Full text of the Constitution of Australia with all amendments, from the Federal Register of Legislation
   from the Federal Register of Legislation – The Constitution as in force on 1 June 2003 together with proclamation declaring the establishment of the Commonwealth, letters patent relating to the Office of Governor-General, Statute of Westminster Adoption Act 1942, Australia Act 1986. .
   The Commonwealth of Australia Constitution Act 1900 (UK) as a British statute; does not include amendments to the Constitution itself.
 Commonwealth of Australia Constitution Act, 1900. Entry on the origins, development, structure and evolution of the Australian constitution at Documenting a Democracy.
 Full text (HTML) file of the Constitution. From the Parliament of Australia web site.
 Royal Commission of Assent signed by Queen Victoria which enacted the Constitution; see these web pages: National Archives of Australia and Documenting a Democracy.
 A First Reading Of The Australian Constitution – side-by-side commentary notes by John Kilcullen, Macquarie University, 2004
 Final Report of the Constitutional Commission Summary: 1988
 Records of the Australasian Federal Conventions of the 1890s

 
1900 in Australian law
 
1975 Australian constitutional crisis
1901 in Australian law
1901 in politics